Panj Peer (or Panj Pir), meaning the Five Great Saints in Persian, used to be accompanied together in their lifetime as follows:

 Khwaja Moinuddin Chishti (1142 – 1236) also known as 'Gharib Nawaz' (Ajmer, Rajasthan, India)
 Hazrat Nizamuddin Auliya  (1238 – 3 April 1325),Delhi
 Khwaja Qutbuddin Bakhtiar Kaki (1173 – 1235), of Mehrauli, Delhi
 Sheikh Baba Farid Ganjshakar (1179 – 1266) (Pakpattan, Punjab)
 Baha'ud din Zakariya (1182 – 1268) (Multan, Punjab)
 Lal Shahbaz Qalandar (1177 – 1274) (Sehwan, Sindh)

Above Sufi saints are mentioned in the great love-epic of the Sufi poet Sayyid Waris Shah "Heer Ranjha", which opens with an invocation to these holy sages.

References 

Indian Sufi saints
Punjabi culture
Sufism in Punjab, Pakistan
Lal Shahbaz Qalandar
Sindhi Sufi saints